The lack of treaties between the First Nations of British Columbia (BC) and the Canadian Crown, is a long-standing problem that has become a major issue in recent years.  In 1763, the British Crown declared that only it could acquire land from First Nations through treaties.  Historically only two treaties were signed with the First Nations of British Columbia. The first of which was the Douglas Treaties, negotiated by Sir James Douglas with the native people of southern Vancouver Island from 1850-1854.  The second treaty, Treaty 8, signed in 1899 was part of the Numbered Treaties that were signed with First Nations across the Prairie regions. British Columbian Treaty 8 signatories are located in the Peace River Country or the far North East of BC.  For over nine decades no more treaties were signed with First Nations of BC; many Native people wished to negotiate treaties, but successive BC provincial governments refused until the 1990s.  A major development was the 1997 decision of the Supreme Court of Canada in the Delgamuukw v. British Columbia case that Aboriginal title still exists in British Columbia and that when dealing with Crown land, the government must consult with and may have to compensate First Nations whose rights are affected.

History

In 1991 the Report of the BC Claims Task Force was released recommending a treaty commission be set up.  The British Crown passed its authority to negotiate treaties to Canada when it was created in 1867.  Even though only the Canadian federal government has the authority to enter into treaties with First Nations  in 1992 the newly created British Columbia Treaty Commission (BCTP) and BC Treaty Process included the BC provincial government in the process by agreement among Canada, BC and the First Nations.  As of 2009 there are 60 First Nations participating in the BC treaty process. Because some First Nations negotiate at a common table, there are 49 sets of negotiations. From 1992 to 2009 there have been a few treaties completed including the Maa-nulth First Nations Treaty signed on April 9, 2009, and the Tsawwassen First Nation Treaty signed on April 3, 2009.  Another Treaty was ratified outside the BC Treaty process in 1999, the Nisga'a Treaty.  In May 1993 the Treaty Commission allocated approximately $432 million in negotiation support funding to more than 50 First Nations- $345.6 million in the form of loans and $86.4 million in the form of contributions.  Of that money the Treaty Commission's total operating costs from 1993 to March 31, 2009 has spent $34.2 million.

There is considerable disagreement about treaty negotiations; while polls have shown that 25% of British Columbians are opposed to it, a substantial minority of native people consider the current treaty process inadequate and have therefore refused to participate.  Tapping into this public sentiment in 2002, the BC Liberal Party mailed out ballots for a provincial British Columbia Aboriginal treaty referendum on principles for treaty negotiations, sparking protests and a boycott.  Because of the boycott and general public apathy only about a third of eligible voters took part in the referendum,  which passed with 80% of those who responded voting "Yes" to continuing the Treaty Process.

A November 21, 2007 court ruling threatened the Treaty Process. The judge ruled that the Xeni Gwet'in First Nation could demonstrate Aboriginal title to half of the Nemaiah Valley, and that the province had no power over these lands. Under the BC treaty process, negotiating nations have received as little as 5% of their claimed land recognized. Grand Chief Stewart Phillip, president of the Union of B.C. Indian Chiefs, member governments of which reject the treaty process and remain outside it, has called the court victory a "nail in the coffin" of the B.C. treaty process.  He went on to say, "Why would any First Nation be foolish enough to ratify any [treaty] settlement for less than five per cent of their territory when the Xeni Gwet'in [have] achieved recognition of their title to 50 per cent of their territory?"

Even with the Xeni Gwet'in ruling First Nations across BC are still continuing the Treaty process advancing through the six-stage process to eventual Treaty implementation.  While Chief Stewart Phillip had claimed that the First Nations themselves would slow down or leave the treaty process it is the Canadian government who is holding up many of the treaties.

BC Treaty negotiation stages
In 1992 The Treaty Commission and the treaty process were established in by agreement among Canada, British Columbia and the First Nations Summit.  Through the Treaty Commission a process was reached where treaties would follow a six-stage system to successful Negotiation.

First Nation treaty status

See also

British Columbia Treaty Process
British Columbia Aboriginal treaty referendum, 2002
List of First Nations governments in British Columbia
The Canadian Crown and Aboriginal peoples
Royal Proclamation of 1763

References

First Nations history in British Columbia
Political history of British Columbia
Aboriginal title in Canada